Algerine Hill is a mountain in the Central New York region of New York state. It is located south of Furnaceville, New York.

References

Mountains of Otsego County, New York
Mountains of New York (state)